was a Japanese band consisting of Emi Fujita (born May 15, 1963, singer and wife) and Ryuji Fujita (born November 7, 1963, guitarist and husband). 

The band's debut single was Umi no Soko de Utau Uta (unofficial translation: "The Song To Sing At The Bottom Of The Ocean") released in July, 1994. Le Couple is famous for their song Hidamari No Uta which was part of the soundtrack for the 1997 Japanese TV drama series Under One Roof 2. The CD single sold over 1.8 million copies. After the band suspended its activities, Emi Fujita started her solo career. She made her solo debut in November 2001 with the album camomile.

The couple divorced in February 2007.

References

See also
 List of best-selling singles in Japan

Japanese musical duos
Musical groups from Tokyo
Pony Canyon artists